Salomonelaps (commonly known as Solomons coral snake) is a genus of snake in the family Elapidae that contains the sole species Salomonelaps par.

It is found in the Solomon Islands.

References 

Elapidae
Monotypic snake genera
Reptiles of the Solomon Islands
Reptiles described in 1884